Hrgota is a South Slavic surname. Notable people with the surname include:

Branimir Hrgota (born 1993), Swedish footballer
Robert Hrgota (born 1988), Slovenian ski jumper

Croatian surnames